Oakland County Football Club is an American soccer club based in Royal Oak, Michigan, located in the Detroit metropolitan area. Beginning with the 2020 season, they compete in USL League Two. The club previously competed in the United Premier Soccer League and Premier League of America.

History
Oakland County FC was founded as Oakland United FC in 2015 and played its first season in the Great Lakes Premier League.

In its inaugural season, Oakland United finished fourth in the five-team league, with a record of 2–1–5.

The club rebranded for the 2016 season, with a new name and new logo by New York City-based graphic designer Matthew Wolff. They finished with a final record of 4–2–4, rendering them a fourth-place finish in the PLA East Division.

On January 27, 2017, the club announced that it would be moving to a more centralized location in Royal Oak.

In February 2017, the club announced a new coaching staff: Nicolino Morana was hired as head coach on February 22, and Mathius Johnson as Assistant Coach on February 28.

On June 3, 2017, Oakland County FC hosted the Muskegon Risers. At the match, a club record attendance of 707 was recorded.

In March 2018, OCFC ownership announced the move to Clawson, MI as the new home for the club. On March 1, 2018, the Oakland County FC Supporters’ Trust was established. With the trust, fans can purchase a membership within the trust which grants them an ownership stake of the club.

On March 23, 2018, Nicolino Morana stepped down as head coach of the club to become Technical Director. In turn, Darryl Evans (head coach) and Derek Peters (assistant coach) were announced as the team's coaching staff for the 2018 season.

On November 5, 2019, OCFC was officially announced as a member of USL League Two.

On December 23, 2019, Vinnie Vasilevski was named head coach in replacement of Darryl Evans.

May 9, 2021 marked the inaugural USL League Two match for the club, notching a 3-0 victory over Fort Wayne FC.

On July 5, 2021, OCFC defeated the Flint City Bucks, 3-1, and became the 2022 Michigan Milk Cup Champions.

Stadium
 Stoney Creek High School (2015–2016)
 Royal Oak High School (2017)
 Clawson Stadium (2018–2021)
 Royal Oak High School (2022-)

Current roster

Front office

Ownership
  Theo Foutris
  Nicolino Morana
  OCFC Supporters' Trust (Luke Zagorski & Robert Kerr, Directors)

Head coach
  Waad Sana (2016)
  Nicolino Morana (2017)
  Darryl Evans (2018–2019)
  Vinnie Vasilevski (2020–2022)
  Brian Doyle (2023-present)

Assistant coach
  Borce Kosteski (2021-present)
  Igor Blazevski (2021-present)
  Trevor Foster (2021-present)
  Kirk Johnson (2022-present)
  Timothy Ho (2022-present)
  Craig Dejong (2019)
  Joseph Beshara (2019)
  Derek Peters (2018-2019)
  Matthius Johnson (2017)

Year-by-year

Historic record vs opponents

 Note: Table includes all competitive matches and does not include friendlies.
Updated to end of 2016 season

References

 New soccer club comes to Oakland County
 OAKLAND COUNTY FC

External links
 
 Facebook
 Twitter

Association football clubs established in 2015
Soccer clubs in Michigan
United Premier Soccer League teams
Premier League of America teams
2015 establishments in Michigan
Oakland County, Michigan